USS Haddock (SSN-621), was the last  to be built. She was also the third ship of the United States Navy to be named after the haddock, a large species of fish.

The contract to build her was awarded to Ingalls Shipbuilding in Pascagoula, Mississippi on 24 August 1960 and her keel was laid down on 24 April 1961.  She was launched on 21 May 1966, sponsored by Mrs. Corinne (Steven) Morris, wife of Representative Thomas G. Morris of New Mexico who had served on USS Sealion (SS-195) before WWII, and commissioned on 22 December 1967 with Commander Stanley J. Anderson in command.

Service history
Haddock'''s first homeport was in San Diego, as part of Submarine Squadron 3. Following a deployment to the Western Pacific, her home port was transferred to Pearl Harbor in time for her first overhaul, which was completed in 1972. Haddock was awarded the Meritorious Unit Commendation for significant achievements during her next deployment.

In 1977, Haddock had a 19-month overhaul in Mare Island, following which she was restationed in San Diego, and Submarine Squadron Three.Haddock completed her seventh deployment to the Western Pacific on 23 December 1983. She then went to Mare Island in October 1984 for her third overhaul and returned to San Diego and Submarine Squadron Three in February 1987. Haddock earned the Battle Efficiency "E" Award for fiscal year 1988.Haddock deployed to the Western Pacific for the eleventh time from July to October 1991.History needed for 1991–1993.FateHaddock was decommissioned and struck from the Naval Vessel Register on 7 April 1993. Ex-Haddock'' entered the Nuclear Powered Ship and Submarine Recycling Program on 1 October 2000.  Recycling was completed on 1 October 2001.

References

External links
 

 

Ships built in Pascagoula, Mississippi
Permit-class submarines
Cold War submarines of the United States
Nuclear submarines of the United States Navy
1966 ships